Occultation in Shia Islam refers to the eschatological belief that the Mahdi, a descendant of the Islamic prophet Muhammad, has already been born and he was subsequently concealed, but he will reemerge and he will establish justice and peace on earth at the end of time. The signs of his (re)appearance are largely common in Shia and Sunni, (although Sunni do not believe the Mahdi has already been born and is in occultation),
and the belief in the eschatological Mahdi remains popular among all Muslims, possibly owing to numerous traditions to this effect in canonical Sunni and Shia sources.

However, the branches of Shia Islam that believe in it differ with regard to the identity of the Mahdi. The mainstream Shia identifies him as Muhammad al-Mahdi, the twelfth imam, who is believed to be responsible for the affairs of men and, in particular, their inward spiritual guidance during the occultation.

Twelver Shia

Twelver Shia is the mainstream branch of Shia Islam, accounting for 85 percent of the Shia population. The Twelvers believe that their twelfth Imam, Muhammad al-Mahdi, is in occultation. During his Minor Occultation (874-941), the twelfth Imam is believed to have remained in regular contact with four successive agents, collectively known as the Four Deputies. During the Major Occultation (941-present), however, there is no agent of the Hidden Imam on earth, though it is believed that he remains providentially living in his physical body until his reappearance in the end of time.

The Twelver theory of occultation crystallized in the first half of the fourth (tenth) century based on rational and textual arguments. This theory, for instance, sets forth that the life of Muhammad al-Mahdi has been miraculously prolonged, arguing that the earth cannot be void of the imam as the highest proof of God. As another example, while the Abbasid threat might have initially forced the twelfth imam into occultation, according to this doctrine, his absence continues until initial conditions are met for his reappearance, including humankind's readiness for the message of the Hidden Imam.

Minor Occultation
Immediately after the death of Hasan al-Askari in 260 (873-874), Uthman al-Amri claimed that the eleventh Imam had a young son, named Muhammad, who had entered a state of occultation due to the threat to his life from the Abbasids. As the special representative of al-Askari, Uthman also claimed that he had been appointed to represent the son of the eleventh Imam. Possibly the only public appearance of Muhammad was to lead the funeral prayer for his father instead of his uncle, Ja'far.

In his new capacity, Uthman received petitions and made available their responses, sometimes in writing. As the closest associate of al-Askari, most of al-Askari's local representatives continued to support Uthman. He later introduced his son, Abu Ja'far Muhammad ibn Uthman, as the next representative of al-Mahdi. In turn, as his replacement, Abu Ja'far nominated Abu al-Qasim al-Husayn ibn Ruh al-Nawbakhti.

This period, later termed the Minor Occultation, ended after about seventy years with the death of the fourth agent, Abu al-Hasan Ali ibn Muhammad al-Samarri, who is said to have received a letter from al-Mahdi shortly before his death. The letter predicted the death of Abu al-Hasan in six days and announced the beginning of the complete occultation, later called the Major Occultation. The letter, ascribed to al-Mahdi, added that the complete occultation would continue until God granted him permission to manifest himself again in a time when the earth would be filled with tyranny. This and similar letters to the four agents and other Shia figures are said to have had the same handwriting, suggesting that they were written by the Hidden Imam.

Major Occultation

The Major Occultation, a later term, began with the death of the fourth agent in 329 (940-941), who did not designate a successor. In this period, which continues today, there is no agent of the Hidden Imam on earth. There were likely early traditions among the Shia that had already predicted the two periods of occultation. These hadiths were previously cited, for instance, by the Waqifites in reference to the two arrests of Musa al-Kazim, the seventh Imam.

In the absence of the Hidden Imam, the leadership vacuum in the Twelver community was gradually filled by the jurists in their new capacity as general deputy to the Hidden Imam. It is also popularly held that the Hidden Imam occasionally appears to the pious in person or, more commonly, in dreams and visions. The accounts of these encounters are numerous and widespread among the Twelvers.

Isma'ili Shia

Isma'ili Shia branched off from mainstream Shia over the succession of Isma'il, who predeceased his father, Ja'far al-Sadiq, the sixth imam. This group either believed that Isma'il was still alive but in concealment or instead recognized the imamate of Isma'il's son, Muhammad, and his descendants.  Today, Isma'ilis are divided into two groups, Nizari and Musta'li. The Nizarite imam is the present Aga Khan IV, their forty-ninth imam in the line of succession. The Musta'lis, however, believe that their twenty-first imam and his progeny went into occultation.  In the absence of their imam, Musta'lis take guidance from Da'i al-Mutlaq. Different branches of Musta'li Shia differ on who the current Da'i al-Mutlaq is.

Before the rise of the Fatimid Caliphate, as a major Isma'ili Shia dynasty, the terms Mahdi and Qa'im were used interchangeably for the messianic imam anticipated in Shia traditions. With the rise of the Fatimids in the tenth century CE, however, al-Qadi al-Nu'man argued that some of these predictions had materialized by the first Fatimid caliph, Abdallah al-Mahdi Billah, while the rest would be fulfilled by his successors. Henceforth, their literature referred to the awaited eschatological imam only as Qa'im (instead of Mahdi).

Zaydi Shia 
In Zaydi view, imams are not endowed with superhuman qualities, and expectations for their mahdiship are thus often marginal. One exception is the extinct Husaynites in Yemen, who denied the death of al-Husayn ibn al-Qasim al-Iyani and awaited his return.

Other views
Historically, various Muslim figures were identified with the eschatological Mahdi or used the name as an honorific title with messianic significance. These include the Umayyad Umar II and the Abbasid al-Mahdi, among many others. Similarly, mahdism and occultation are recurring themes in the history of Shia. For instance, long-standing Shia traditions were appropriated by the now-extinct Waqifites to argue that Musa al-Kazim, the seventh imam, had not died but was in occultation. Even earlier, the now-extinct Kaysanites denied the death of Muḥammad ibn al-Hanafiyya and awaited his return as the Mahdi.  The Qarmatians, an extinct branch of Isma'ili Shia, believed in the mahdiship of Muhammad ibn Isma'il and his imminent return.  Similar figures in Shia history are Muhammad al-Nafs al-Zakiyya, Muhammad ibn Qasim al-Alawi, Yahya ibn Umar, and Muhammad ibn Ali al-Hadi.

See also
Eschatology
Islamic eschatology
The Fourteen Infallibles
Du'a Nudba
Kitab al-Ghayba (al-Nu'mani), a work on the topic by the 10th-century Twelver Shia scholar Muhammad ibn Ibrahim al-Nu'mani
Kitab al-Ghayba (al-Tusi), a work on the topic by the 11th-century Twelver Shia scholar al-Shaykh al-Tusi
Rajʿa ('return'), the concomitant concept of return after occultation
Reappearance of Muhammad al-Mahdi, the concept of return in Twelver Shi'ism
Signs of the appearance of the Mahdi (in broader Islam)

References

Bibliography 

 
 
 
 
 
 
 
 
 
 
 
 

Hujjat Allah al-Mahdi
Islamic terminology
Mahdism
Shia eschatology